Holy Mother of God Church (Armenian: Սուրբ Աստվածածին եկեղեցի), sometimes known as Yeghvard Church, is a medieval Armenian church located at the center of Yeghvard in the Kotayk Province of Armenia. It was completed in 1301 during the rule of the Zakarid dynasty. It was built and completed as an alternative church of the nearby ruined Katoghike Church, a large three-nave basilica dating back to the 5th and 6th centuries.

Architecture 
The Holy Mother of God Church is a small cruciform central-plan interior with a rectangular but almost square plan exterior and a second floor. Centered above is a single cylindrical drum and a conical umbrella type dome. The drum is made up of twelve columns with arches that support the weight of the dome.

The second floor has a semi-cruciform layout with single small windows to the left and rear façades, while on the right is a larger window with a single column that stands in the middle. A small inset portal sits in the middle of the front façade, with the remnants of exterior stone steps that once led to the second floor.

The first floor has a single large portal at the front façade with a semi-circular lintel and decorative columns, while the left, right, and rear façades each have a small window. The left and right are surrounded by a large intricately carved cross in high-relief.

Exceptionally rich decorations cover a large portion of the church. There are beautiful motifs on each side at the second floor level and geometric patterns around the cornices, eaves, and other parts of the walls. Notable is the large cross carved in high relief on the front flanked by the Virgin Mary holding the baby Jesus and another saint. Below and just above the portal to the second floor are the motifs of a bull and lion. Above the larger window on the right façade is a motif of a large bird with a geometric rosette on its chest holding a hooved animal in its talons. On the left façade is a mountain goat, and on the rear is a large cat pouncing upon a goat.

Adjacent to the church are the remains of a chapel foundation. Khachkars and graves are nearby.

Gallery

References

External links 
 Armeniapedia.org: Yeghvard Church & Katoghike Church
 FindArmenia.com: Surp Astvatzatzin (Surp Nshan) Church of Yeghvard
 Yeghvard Church
Virtual Tour to Yeghvard St.Astvatsatsin church

Armenian Apostolic churches in Armenia
Tourist attractions in Kotayk Province
Buildings and structures in Kotayk Province
Churches completed in 1301
14th-century churches in Armenia
14th-century Oriental Orthodox church buildings